The stadium at the archaeological site of Olympia, Greece, is located to the east of the sanctuary of Zeus. It was the location of many of the sporting events at the Ancient Olympic Games.

History
During the 2004 Summer Olympics, it hosted the shot put events.

Features 

The track was made of hard-packed clay to serve as traction for the contestants in the running events. As in current day athletics, a white block was placed on one end of the track where the athletes would line up to place their feet and got ready to start of the race. The white block was used to align all the athletes so they would all run the same distance.

Gallery

See also
 Stadium of Delphi

References

External links

Ancient Greek buildings and structures
Ancient Olympia
Olympic athletics venues
Sports venues in Greece
Stadiums
Venues of the 2004 Summer Olympics